The 1950–51 Manitoba Junior Hockey League season saw the Winnipeg Monarchs win the league championship.

Regular season

Playoffs
Semi-Final
Monarchs defeated Black Hawks 4-games-to-none
Turnbull Cup Championship
Brandon lost to Monarchs 4-games-to-2
Western Memorial Cup Semi-Final
Monarchs defeated Port Arthur Bruins  (TBJHL) 4-games-to-3
Western Memorial Cup Final (Abbott Cup)
Monarchs defeated Regina Pats (WCJHL) 4-games-to-3 with 1 game tied
Memorial Cup Championship
Monarchs lost to Barrie Flyers (OHA) 4-games-to-none

Awards

All-Star Teams

References 
Manitoba Junior Hockey League
Manitoba Hockey Hall of Fame
Hockey Hall of Fame
Winnipeg Free Press Archives
Brandon Sun Archives

MJHL
Manitoba Junior Hockey League seasons